Michael Calvo Villamil (born 26 December 1977) is a Cuban triple jumper.

Career

His personal best jump is 17.30 metres, achieved in February 1997 in Havana. The result places him tenth on the all-time Cuban performers list, behind Yoelbi Quesada, Lázaro Betancourt, Aliecer Urrutia, Yoandri Betanzos, Alexander Martínez, Jorge Reyna, Yoel García, Pedro Pérez and Arnie David Giralt.

Achievements

External links

sports-reference
Picture of Michael Calvo

References

1977 births
Living people
Cuban male triple jumpers
Athletes (track and field) at the 1999 Pan American Games
Athletes (track and field) at the 2000 Summer Olympics
Olympic athletes of Cuba
Pan American Games medalists in athletics (track and field)
Pan American Games bronze medalists for Cuba
Medalists at the 1999 Pan American Games
20th-century Cuban people